I'm a Celebrity...Get Me Out of Here! returned to ITV for its seventh series on 12 November and ran until 30 November 2007.

Series 6 winner Matt Willis and his fiancée, Emma Griffiths, presented spin-off show I'm a Celebrity...Get Me Out of Here! NOW! in Australia, while Mark Durden-Smith returned to front the United Kingdom segment of the show. The I'm a Celebrity...Exclusive teatime programme is not shown as part of the new series.

The official line-up was confirmed by ITV on 10 November 2007. The series was won by actor Christopher Biggins.

Celebrities
The official celebrity line-up was revealed on 10 November 2007. However, Malcolm McLaren immediately resigned from the show before entering the camp on the first day, stating he didn't have the time and intention to do the show. On Day 2, former The Apprentice contestant, Katie Hopkins was announced as his replacement and competed in the jungle throughout the series.

Results and elimination

Bushtucker Trials
The contestants take part in daily trials to earn food. For the first three trials the two camps went head to head, only the winner of the trial's camp had any food. Tuesday, 20 November was the last time the public chose who took part in the trials from now on the contestants will have to decide for themselves who takes part in them because the public will vote for who leaves instead.

 The public voted for who they wanted to face the trial
 The contestants decided who did which trial
 The trial was compulsory and neither the public or celebrities decided who took part

Notes
 Janice was ruled out of this trial on medical grounds.
  Biggins was a new addition to the show. The public did not vote for him to take part in the trial, but he participated in the trial as a lifeline for Janice.
 Biggins was ruled out of this trial on medical grounds.
 Rodney was ruled out of this trial on medical grounds.

Star count

Bush Battles 
This year, the celebrities were all given a chance to win immunity from the first eviction. To do this they had to compete in a Bush Battle. The first battle consisted of 4 celebrities having to sit in a jeep. Whoever stayed in the jeep for the longest would win. After winning, John is known for saying "I am the victor." The second battle saw them each having a large egg timer. Whoever didn't let their egg timer run out would be the winner. The third battle was to stand tied to a tree holding a chain which would flush out frog spawn upon their head (they were chained to the tree). Whoever flushed out the substance last won.

The Camps

Croc Creek
Croc Creek consisted of Anna Ryder Richardson, Cerys Matthews, John Burton Race, Marc Bannerman and Rodney Marsh.

When the 2 camps merged Croc Creek became base camp.

Snake Rock
Snake Rock was initially supposed to consist of Gemma Atkinson, Jason "J" Brown, Janice Dickinson, Lynne Franks and Malcolm McLaren, but McLaren quit the show and never made it into the camp. Katie Hopkins was put into Snake Rock on Day 2.

Snake Rock was abandoned once the two tribes became one, but it was used in the bush battles.

References

External links
 
 
 

2007 British television seasons
07